Jean Claude Ndoli (born 7 September 1986 in Kibungo) is a Rwandan-born footballer, currently playing for Musanze Butare in the Rwandan Premier League.

Career
He signed for APR FC in 2006, from Rwanda Police FC. He made his debut for APR FC in the first game of the 2006 Rwandan Premier League season against SC Kiyovu Sport.

Playing with APR FC from 2005 to 2016, Ndoli has won 10 Rwandan Premier League titles and 7 Rwandan Cups. He split duties and play and goalkeeping coach at the end of his time with APR FC.

International career
Ndoli is a regular started as the #1 Goalkeeper for the Rwanda national football team and has played 16 times for the "Wasps". He started in goal as Rwanda lost the 2009 CECAFA Cup final 2–0 to Uganda. Ndoli last received a call-up in 2016.

References

1986 births
Living people
People from Ngoma District
Rwandan footballers
Rwanda international footballers
APR F.C. players
Association football goalkeepers
Rwanda A' international footballers
2011 African Nations Championship players
2016 African Nations Championship players